Velyka Novosilka Raion was one of the raions of Donetsk Oblast, located in southeastern Ukraine. The administrative center of the raion was the urban-type settlement of Velyka Novosilka. The raion was abolished on 18 July 2020 as part of the administrative reform of Ukraine, which reduced the number of raions of Donetsk Oblast to eight, of which only five were controlled by the government.

On 15 May 2014 (during the early phase of the  War in Donbass) the Donbas Battalion secured the town from the pro-Russian separatists of the Donetsk People's Republic. According to (the then commander the Donbas Battalion) Semen Semenchenko the local police chief, deputies from the Party of Regions and the chairman of the district council "fled in an unknown direction."

Localities 
 Zelenyi Hai

Demographics 
According to the 2001 Ukrainian Census,

References

Former raions of Donetsk Oblast
1923 establishments in Ukraine
Ukrainian raions abolished during the 2020 administrative reform